Oskoršnica is a settlement in the Municipality of Semič in southeastern Slovenia. The municipality is included in the Southeast Slovenia Statistical Region. The entire area is part of the historical region of Lower Carniola.

References

External links
Oskoršnica at Geopedia

Populated places in the Municipality of Semič